Following the January 2015 Greek election, the leader of the largest party SYRIZA, Alexis Tsipras, was charged with forming a coalition government.

Process
DIMAR MP and member of the central committee of DIMAR, Spyros Lykoudis, stated his preference for a broader SYRIZA-DIMAR-PASOK coalition.

Panos Kammenos, leader of Independent Greeks (ANEL) stated he favored a broad alliance of anti-bailout parties, excluding Golden Dawn. Following the rumors of a third bailout, Kammenos attempted to convince maverick ND and PASOK MPs to bring down the government.

Dimitris Koutsoumpas, leader of the Communist Party (KKE), reiterated the party's stance against cooperation with other parties, stating alliances or partnerships must be done in terms of social movements, "not from the top down, where leaders sit down and find, one, two, three things they agree on and sign a program. Those alliances have been shown to have many bad side effects for the labour movement."

Bloomberg Businessweek suggested that SYRIZA's choice for coalition partner would reveal its intentions toward negotiations with the Troika. If SYRIZA forms the government with The River, then it could "signal that Tsipras wants to avoid a showdown with the troika lenders" as [To Potami leader Stavros] "Theodorakis strongly opposes such a confrontation and says he wouldn't partner with Syriza unless Tsipras promised to keep Greece in the euro currency". If SYRIZA partners with Independent Greeks, it shows a desire to fight with the Troika, given the parties shared anti-austerity ideology. However, that is the only policy that the two parties share.

Shortly after the election, Stavros Theodorakis, leader of The River, was expected to meet with Alexis Tsipras in the next 48 hours. However, on 26 January 2015, Tsipras and Independent Greeks leader Panos Kammenos surprisingly agreed to form an "anti-austerity coalition". Yanis Varoufakis, expected to be appointed Minister of Finance, said they would "come to Frankfurt and Berlin and Brussels with [...] a plan to minimise the cost of that Greek debacle to the average German. We must be very careful not to toy with fast or loose talk of Grexit. Grexit is not on the cards."

Government formation agreement

As of 26 January, the written government formation agreement between ANEL and Syriza - outlining policies and the working program of the government - was yet to be announced. The list below feature the most important pledges made by Syriza in its election campaign, as it is expected all of them will be adopted without any change by the government agreement:
 Statement by Alexis Tsipras: A Syriza led government will respect Greece’s eurozone member obligation to maintain a balanced budget, and will commit to quantitative targets. However, the new government will claim its right to decide on its own how to achieve those quantitative targets, and rule out austerity as a tool to be used.
 Statement by Alexis Tsipras: "A Syriza government will not respect the agreements signed by the previous government. The day after the election, there will be no memorandums, no troika." Chief of the European Central Bank, Mario Draghi, replied that if Greece canceled its Troika program, it wouldn't be eligible for the quantitative easing funds the bank planned to inject into the economies of all eurozone states during the next 18 months, as the rule is, that such injections were conditional on either having government bonds with credit ratings above junk bond status (investment grade) or alternatively a completed Troika program review needs to find the state in full compliance with its Troika program. Tsipras clarified, the aim of a Syriza government would be - after having torn apart the existing bailout programme - to negotiate a new programme with its eurozone lenders in place by July 2015 (emphasizing Syriza would only negotiate with representatives of European Union institutions and not the Troika officials - meaning the IMF would be excluded to take part), which would make Greece eligible - from the date of signing such new agreement - to benefit from ECB's QE programme.
 Statement by Yanis Varoufakis: "Greece should not receive any more loans as it needs to break its ties with borrowed money, and if Syriza wins an overall majority in the election, Greece should ask for two weeks to prepare its proposals and then submit a request to be given a leeway to reach an agreement with Greece's partners by June 2015. The cost of a Grexit would be too heavy for Greece as well as Europe."
 Statement by Alexis Tsipras (ahead of election): Beside of refusing to comply with the previously negotiated terms in the bailout agreement, Syriza will at the same time demand a "write down on most of the nominal value of debt, so that it becomes sustainable". Statement by Yanis Varoufakis (1 day after election): "We will create a rational plan for our debt restructure so that austerity ends; [We are not talking about writing off 50% of the nominal debt] - this [earlier statement] was just a bit of posturing from our side ahead of the negotiation. What really matters is, that we now sit down and discuss a way in which the haircut to our debt is minimized. We do not want to pay back less than we can, but what we are saying is, [that] this debt repayment schedule, as we have in the moment, is complete unrealistic and utterly disconnected from Greek growth. What we want to do is, that we want to bind our repayment to our growth. We want to make our creditors partners to our recovery not our misery. Grexit is not on the cards".
 Statement by Yanis Varoufakis: "We are going to destroy the basis upon which [the oligarchy] has built for decade after decade a system and network that viciously sucks the energy and the economic power from everybody else in society."
 Statement by Alexis Tsipras: "Syriza will implement measures to ease burden on Greece's middle class, including abolition of the ENFIA property tax, raising the tax-free threshold to 12,000 euros and settlement of overdue taxes."
 Statement by Alexis Tsipras: "Syriza will establish an anti-corruption task force accountable to the Prime Minister. Yanis Varoufakis expanded this pledge one day after the election by stating: "We will come up with genuine reforms that we need to implement in Greece, in order to put an end to both bureaucracy, corruption and tax immunity."
 Statement by Alexis Tsipras: "Syriza will switch the defunct public broadcaster ERT back into operation.
 Other Syriza election pledges were to: Raise the minimum wage, reverse earlier implemented pension cuts and public sector pay cuts, cut power prices for low income families, cut taxes, and expand the number of government jobs.
 The following ANEL demands to be a part of the government - were accepted by Syriza: "To form an investigative committee in Parliament to look into the circumstances that led to Greece being forced to sign its first troika bailout in 2010 (including how the country’s debt spiraled)", granting ANEL veto right against any proposal to reach an agreement with the Republic of Macedonia on a composite name, putting on hold any plans for separation between the Church and state, and letting ANEL decide the government's stance on defense matters (by appointing Panos Kammenos as Minister of Defense).

References

2015
Greek government formation 2015
2015 in Greek politics